Stephen Caffrey (born in Dublin on 9 December 1975), is an Irish former footballer who has retired from League of Ireland First Division club Athlone Town.

Career
Stephen Caffrey began his career at Bohemians as a central defender in 1994. He spent 2 years there without making the breakthrough to the first team before moving to Glenavon in December 1996. He became a fan favourite at the Lurgan club and established himself in their midfield before returning to Bohemians in August 1999.

Caffrey formed a solid partnership with Kevin Hunt in the centre of Bohs' midfield and played a huge part in Bohemians League and Cup double in 2001. He added a second winners medal to his collection as Bohs regained the league title in 2002/2003.

When his contract ended at the end of the 2004 season, Caffrey moved to St Patrick's Athletic but he had an injury hit time at the club and Gareth Farrelly brought him back to Bohemians for a third spell until the end of the 2006 season.

He has most recently had short spells at Glenavon and Sporting Fingal before signing for Athlone Town in December 2009.

Stephen now helps coach a young football club.

Honours
League of Ireland: 2
 Bohemians — 2000/2001, 2002/2003
FAI Cup: 1
 Bohemians — 2001
Irish Cup: 1
 Glenavon — 1996/1997
 Irish League Cup
 Glenavon — 1996/1997
 Gold Cup
 Glenavon — 1997/1998

References

Republic of Ireland association footballers
League of Ireland players
Bohemian F.C. players
Glenavon F.C. players
St Patrick's Athletic F.C. players
Sporting Fingal F.C. players
Athlone Town A.F.C. players
1975 births
Living people
Association footballers from County Dublin
Belvedere F.C. players
Association football midfielders

fr:Stephen Caffrey